This is a List of historical cities and towns of Mongolia. Mongolia is a landlocked country in East and Central Asia. It is bordered by Russia to the north and China to the south, east and west. Ulaanbataar, the capital and largest city, is home to about 45% of the population.

Special characteristics 
"Mongolian cities" means those cities that were built in Mongolia as well those built in areas directly under Mongol influence. The special characteristic of Mongolian historical cities is that they came into being amidst a predominantly nomadic society. It is a misunderstanding to assume that there were no cities in Mongolia, or that all of the people were entirely nomadic all through their history. Based on current research, Mongolia's tradition of cities goes back over 2000 years.

Historical towns and settlements

Prehistoric settlements 
       Tamsagbulag Neolithic Settlement, Khalkhgol sum, Dornod Province
       Norovlin Neolithic Settlement, Bulgan sum, Dornod Province

Xiongnu period (209 BC-AD 93) 

	Lungtang
	Lungcheng (Mongolian: Luut; Dragon City), capital of the Xiongnu Empire, Orkhon River valley
       Lungzi
	City built by Zhaoxin in 120 BC as ordered by the Shanyu
	Kherlen Tsagaan Aral
	Terelj Hasar Balgas
	Bayanbulag Balgas
	Tsenkher Gol Kherem
	Shuvuutiin Gol Kherem

Rouran period (AD 330 - 555) 
	Mume, capital of the Rouran Khaganate, Orkhon River valley
	Lungcheng

Göktürk and Uighur period (AD 555-840) 

	Toba Khan’s Ord
	Bilge Khan’s Ord
	Khar Els
	Khar Balgas
	Baibalyk
	Kharkhurem

Khitan Liao period (AD 907-1125) 

	Zuun kherem
	Baruun kherem
	Bars khot
	Chin Tolgoin Balgas (Zhenzhou, built in AD 994)
	Khar Bukhyn Balgas

Mongol Empire and Yuan period (AD 1206-1368) 

	Khaidu Khan’s Ord
	Tenduk
	Tataryn Kherem
	Genghis Khan’s Four Ordos
	Karakorum, capital of the Mongol Empire
	Suurin
	Tosokh
	Shar Ord
	Khokh nuuriin Ord
	Ongiin Ord
	Khogshin Teeliin Balgas
	Tsagaan Balgas
	Arlyn Balgas

Northern Yuan period (AD 1368-1635) 
Choir - 1691
	Tsagaan Baishin (or White Palace of Tsogt Taij)
	Ikh Khuree (now the capital city Ulaanbaatar) - 1639
	Khovd (city) - In 1685 founded by Galdan Boshugtu Khan on the bank of the Khovd River.
Tsetserleg (city) - 1631. In 1586 the first monastery founded.
Ulaangom - 1686?

Qing period (AD 1691-1911) 
Mörön (city) - 1809
Choibalsan (city) - 1823
Uliastai - 1833
...

Architectural heritages in Mongolia

Choijin Lama Temple
Winter Palace of the Bogd Khan
Erdene Zuu Monastery
Gandantegchinlen Monastery
 Manjusri Monastery
:Category:Buddhist monasteries in Mongolia

References 

This article is based on the textbook "Mongol Ulsyn Tuuh" (History of Mongolia), National University of Mongolia, Ulaanbaatar, Mongolia, 2006.

See also

Architecture of Mongolia
Culture of Mongolia
History of Mongolia
List of cities in Mongolia